Epinomeuta is a genus of moths of the family Yponomeutidae.

Species
Epinomeuta acutipennella - Rebel, 1935 
Epinomeuta inversella - Rebel, 1935 
Epinomeuta minorella - Rebel, 1935 
Epinomeuta truncatipennella - Rebel, 1935 

Yponomeutidae